The Primetime Emmy Award for Outstanding Writing for Variety Special is awarded to one television special each year. In the 1960s and between 1979 and 2008, specials competed alongside nominees for Outstanding Writing for a Variety Series.

In the following list, the first titles listed in gold are the winners; those not in gold are nominees, which are listed in alphabetical order. The years given are those in which the ceremonies took place:



Winners and nominations

1970s

1980s

1990s

2000s

2010s

2020s

Individuals with multiple awards
Totals include individuals wins for Outstanding Writing for a Variety, Music or Comedy Program.

3 wins
 Louis C.K. (2 consecutive)
 Lily Tomlin

2 wins
 Dave Boone (consecutive)
 Chris Rock

Individuals with multiple nominations
Totals are for individuals nominated since 2009.

10 nominations
 Dave Boone

7 nominations
 Jon Macks
 Seth Meyers

6 nominations
 Louis C.K.
 John Mulaney

4 nominations
 Alex Baze
 Tina Fey
 Paul Greenberg
 Robert Smigel

3 nominations
 Barry Adelman
 Robert Carlock
 R.J. Fried
 Patton Oswalt
 Amy Poehler
 Craig Rowin
 Marc Shaiman
 Michael Shoemaker

2 nominations
 James Anderson
 Samantha Bee
 Ashley Nicole Black
 Michael Brumm
 Pat Cassels
 Dave Chappelle
 Aaron Cohen
 Stephen Colbert
 James Corden
 Billy Crystal
 Devin Delliquanti
 Paul Dinello
 Eric Drysdale
 Ariel Dumas
 Glenn Eichler
 Mathan Erhardt
 David Feldman
 Lewis Friedman
 Hannah Gadsby
 Django Gold
 Gabe Gronli
 Joe Grossman
 Steve Higgins
 Barry Julien
 Miles Kahn
 Jay Katsir
 Chris Kelly
 Erik Kenward
 Rob Klein
 Matt Lappin
 Carol Leifer
 Sara Lukinson
 Sam Means
 Lorne Michaels
 Zhubin Parang
 Paula Pell
 Tom Purcell
 Sarah Schneider
 Amy Schumer
 Ben Schwartz
 Kate Sidley
 Sarah Silverman
 Eric Slovin
 John Solomon
 Emily Spivey
 Brian Stack
 Mason Steinberg
 George Stevens Jr.
 Michael Stevens
 Kent Sublette
 Wanda Sykes
 Melinda Taub
 John Thibodeaux
 Bruce Vilanch
 Colleen Werthmann

Notes

References

Writing for a Variety Special
Screenwriting awards for television